Sherborne, England may refer to:
Sherborne, Dorset
Sherborne, Gloucestershire
Sherborne, Somerset

See also
Sherbourne (disambiguation)